Paul Atkinson (born 19 January 1966) is an English former footballer who played on the left-side of midfield. He appeared three times for England Youth in a tournament in 1983, and played another five games the following year. He began his career at Sunderland, and helped the "Black Cats" to the Third Division title in 1987–88. He joined Port Vale for a £20,000 fee in June 1988, but soon became blighted by injury. He was loaned out to Stafford Rangers and Hartlepool United to help to regain his fitness, but was
forced to retire from professional football on medical advice in January 1991.

Career
Atkinson began his career at Sunderland, winning 18 caps for the England youth-team between 1982 and 1985. He made his first-team debut at home to Norwich City on 27 August 1983. Alan Durban's side went on to post a 13th-place finish in the First Division in 1983–84. The club suffered relegation in the 1984–85 season under the stewardship of Len Ashurst. Lawrie McMenemy then took charge at Roker Park, but failed to halt the club's decline, as Sunderland finished 18th in the Second Division in 1985–86, before suffering relation in 1986–87 after defeat to Gillingham in the play-offs. New boss Denis Smith then led the club straight back up as champions of the Third Division in 1987–88. Smith claimed Atkinson squandered his natural talents by overeating junk food.

Atkinson signed for John Rudge's Port Vale in June 1988 for a £20,000 fee. He scored a brace on his debut in a 3–1 win over Preston North End at Deepdale on 27 August. An ankle injury blighted his career however, and loans spells with Stafford Rangers (January 1989) and Cyril Knowles's Hartlepool United (March 1990) failed to revitalise his career. He played six games for the "Valiants" in 1988–89, and eleven Fourth Division games in his loan spell at Victoria Park. He was forced to retire from professional football on medical advice in January 1991.

Style of play
Atkinson was a speedy midfielder.

Career statistics
Source:

Honours
Sunderland
Football League Third Division: 1987–88

References

1966 births
Living people
Sportspeople from Chester-le-Street
Footballers from County Durham
English footballers
Association football midfielders
Sunderland A.F.C. players
Port Vale F.C. players
Stafford Rangers F.C. players
Hartlepool United F.C. players
Gateshead F.C. players
English Football League players
National League (English football) players